Pelycothorax tylauchenioides is a species of beetles in the family Buprestidae, the only species in the genus Pelycothorax.

References

Monotypic Buprestidae genera